The 2013 Great Southern 4 Hour was an endurance motor race held on 26 May 2013 at the Phillip Island Grand Prix Circuit in Victoria, Australia. It was Round 1 of the 2013 Australian Manufacturers' Championship and as such it was open to "modified production touring cars" complying with the technical regulations for that championship. The race was won by Bob Pearson and Glenn Seton, driving a Mitsubishi Lancer Evo 10.

Class structure
As the race was a round of the 2013 Australian Manufacturers' Championship, the following class structure applied.
 Class A – Extreme Performance
 Class B – High Performance
 Class C – Performance Touring
 Class D – Production Touring
 Class E – Compact Touring
 Class F – Hybrid / Alternative Energy
 Class I – Invitational

There were no starters in Classes E, F or I.

Results

Note: Drivers listed in italics in the above table did not drive the car in the actual race.

References

Great Southern 4 Hour
Australian Manufacturers' Championship
Motorsport at Phillip Island